The 2011 Kwai Tsing District Council election was held on 6 November 2011 to elect all 29 elected members to the 35-member District Council.

The Democratic Party remained the largest party despite its former chairman Lee Wing-tat lost his seat in Lai Wah to the Democratic Alliance for the Betterment and Progress of Hong Kong Chu Lai-ling. Although the pan-democracy camp won the majority of the seats, it was balanced by the appointed and ex officio seats.

Overall election results
Before election:

Change in composition:

References

External links
 Election Results - Overall Results

2011 Hong Kong local elections